Mungialdea, also known as Uribe-Butroe, is a comarca of the province of Biscay, in the Basque Country, Spain. Mungialdea is the heir of the larger historical region of Uribe, which was one of the merindades of Biscay. It comprises the most rural area of the historical region, drained by the Butrón River and with some small municipalities. It is one of the seven comarcas that compose the province of Biscay. Its capital city is Mungia.

Geography 

Mungialdea is located at the north of Biscay, bordering with the comarcas of Busturialdea on the east, Greater Bilbao on the east and south and the Bay of Biscay on the north. 

Its landscape fits with the oceanic climate and can be divided into two subregions:

 The coast, with beaches and high cliffs.
 Butrón, the area surrounding the Butrón river.

Municipalities

References

Comarcas of Biscay

es:Uribe (España)